CRAC might refer to:

 The CRAC-II "Calculation of Reactor Accident Consequences" study.
 A castle, as in Krak des Chevaliers.
 A Computer Room Air Conditioner.
 Clube Recreativo e Atlético Catalano, a Brazilian football (soccer) club commonly known as CRAC
 Clube Recreativo Atlético Campoverdense, a Brazilian football (soccer) club commonly known as CRAC
 Chinese Radio Amateurs Club, China Radio Association Amateur Radio Working Committee, Amateur Radio Club in China commonly known as CRAC 
 Chisholm Residents Activity Club, a social club for residents of Chisholm College, which provides accommodation for students at La Trobe University
 Cholesterol recognition amino acid consensus sequence
 Crac, a 1981 Oscar-winning animated short film
 Calcium Release Activated Channels, ion channels in cell membrane
 Closed Reduction And Cast, an orthopaedic surgical procedure